Dirk van Dalen (born 20 December 1932, Amsterdam) is a Dutch mathematician and historian of science.

Van Dalen studied mathematics and physics and astronomy at the University of Amsterdam. Inspired by the work of Brouwer and Heyting, he received his Ph.D. in 1963 from the University of Amsterdam for the thesis Extension problems in intuitionistic plane Projective geometry. From 1964 to 1966 Van Dalen taught logic and mathematics at MIT, and later Oxford. From 1967 he was professor at the University of Utrecht. In 2003 Dirk van Dalen was awarded the Academy Medal 2003 of the Royal Dutch Academy of Sciences for bringing the works of Brouwer to international attention.

Works 
 1958: (with Yehoshua Bar-Hillel and Azriel Levy) Foundations of Set Theory, North Holland Publishing
 1963: Extension problems in intuitionistic plane projective geometry
 1978: (with H.C. Doets and H. De Swart) Sets: Naive, Axiomatic and Applied, Pergamon Press 
 1980: Logic and Structure, Springer Universitext 
 1981: (editor) Brouwer's Cambridge Lectures on Intuitionism Cambridge University Press 
 1988: 
 2000: (with Heinz-Dieter Ebbinghaus) "Zermelo and the Skolem Paradox", Bulletin of Symbolic Logic 6(2)
 2001: "Intuitionistic Logic", in: The Blackwell Guide to Philosophical Logic, Lou Goble (editor), Blackwell
 2013: L.E.J. Brouwer - Topologist, Intuitionist, Philosopher: How mathematics is rooted in life, Springer-Verlag

References 

 The article was originally created as a translation (Google) of the corresponding article in Dutch Wikipedia.

Further reading 
 Dirk van Dalen Festschrift, Henk Barendregt en anderen (redactie),   University of Utrecht, Department of Philosophy, 1993
 Special issue: a tribute to Dirk van Dalen, Yuri Gurevich (redactie), uitgeverij North-Holland, Amsterdam, 1995.

External links
 Koninklijke bibliotheek over Dirk van Dalen
 Homepage at the University of Utrecht
 

1932 births
Living people
Dutch mathematicians
20th-century Dutch historians
Dutch logicians
Historians of mathematics
Historians of science
Intuitionism
Massachusetts Institute of Technology School of Science faculty
Scientists from Amsterdam
University of Amsterdam alumni
Academic staff of Utrecht University